Hefei West railway station is a railway station under construction in Shushan District, Hefei, Anhui Province, China. The west side of the station building is expected to be completed in 2023, while the entire station is expected to be completed in 2025.

Metro station
The station will be served by Line 3 and Line S1 of the Hefei Metro.

References

Railway stations in Anhui
Railway stations under construction in China
West railway station